The Milwaukee Jewish Film Festival is an annual, publicly-attended film festival hosted by the Harry & Rose Samson Family Jewish Community Center and held in Milwaukee, Wisconsin. The multi-day festival celebrates local, national and international Jewish films and filmmaking. Established in 1997, the film festival is held in a hybrid format, streaming online and offering in-person screenings.

References

External links

1999 establishments in Wisconsin
Festivals in Milwaukee
Film festivals established in 1999
Film festivals in Wisconsin
Jews and Judaism in Wisconsin
Tourist attractions in Milwaukee
Jewish film festivals in the United States